Franjo Krajčar (7 September 1914 – 16 June 1994) was a Yugoslav long-distance runner. He competed in the marathon at the 1952 Summer Olympics.

References

1914 births
1994 deaths
Athletes (track and field) at the 1952 Summer Olympics
Yugoslav male long-distance runners
Yugoslav male marathon runners
Olympic athletes of Yugoslavia
People from Primorje-Gorski Kotar County